Cambiocasa is a European commercial property consultancy company (FIAIP associated.) founded by Francesco Trombiero in 1995.

References

External links 
 Official website

Property companies of Italy